Myrmeleontoidea is a neuropteran superfamily in the clade Myrmeleontiformia.  Engel, Winteron, and Breitkreuz (2018) included the following families:

Superfamily Myrmeleontoidea (syn Nemopteroidea)
 Family Ascalaphidae: owlflies (possibly in Myrmeleontoidea)
 Family †Babinskaiidae 
 Family Myrmeleontidae: antlions (includes Palaeoleontidae; possibly in Ascalaphidae)
 Family Nemopteridae: spoonwings etc
 Family Nymphidae: split-footed lacewings (including Myiodactylidae)
 Family †Rafaelianidae

References 

 
Insect superfamilies